Roland David Smith (March 9, 1906 – May 23, 1965) was an American abstract expressionist sculptor and painter, best known for creating large steel abstract geometric sculptures.

Early life
Roland David Smith was born on March 9, 1906, in Decatur, Indiana and moved to Paulding, Ohio in 1921, where he attended high school.  From 1924 to 1925, he attended Ohio University in Athens (one year) and the University of Notre Dame, which he left after two weeks because there were no art courses. In between, Smith took a summer job working on the assembly line of the Studebaker automobile factory in South Bend, Indiana. He then briefly studied art and poetry at George Washington University in Washington, D.C.

Moving to New York in 1926, he met Dorothy Dehner (to whom he was married from 1927 to 1952) and, on her advice, joined her painting studies at the Art Students League of New York. Among his teachers were the American painter John Sloan and the Czech modernist painter Jan Matulka, who had studied with Hans Hofmann. Matulka introduced Smith to the work of Picasso, Mondrian, Kandinsky, and the Russian Constructivists. In 1929, Smith met John D. Graham, who later introduced him to the welded-steel sculpture of Pablo Picasso and Julio González.

Work

Early work
Smith's early friendship with painters such as Adolph Gottlieb and Milton Avery was reinforced during the Depression of the 1930s, when he participated in the Works Progress Administration's Federal Art Project in New York. Through the Russian émigré artist John Graham, Smith met avant-garde artists such as Stuart Davis, Arshile Gorky and Willem de Kooning. He also discovered the welded sculptures of Julio González and Picasso, which led to an increasing interest in combining painting and construction.

In the Virgin Islands in 1931–32, Smith made his first sculpture from pieces of coral. In 1932, he installed a forge and anvil in his studio at the farm in Bolton Landing that he and Dehner had bought a few years earlier. Smith started by making three-dimensional objects from wood, wire, coral, soldered metal and other found materials but soon graduated to using an oxyacetylene torch to weld metal heads, which are probably the first welded metal sculptures ever made in the United States. A single work may consist of several materials, differentiated by varied patinas and polychromy.

In 1940, the Smiths distanced themselves from the New York art scene and moved permanently to Bolton Landing near Lake George in Upstate New York. At Bolton Landing, he ran his studio like a factory, stocked with large amounts of raw material. The artist would put his sculptures in what is referred to as an upper and lower field, and sometimes he would put them in rows, "as if they were farm crops".

During World War II, Smith worked as a welder for the American Locomotive Company, Schenectady, NY assembling locomotives and M7 tanks. He taught at Sarah Lawrence College.

After 1945
After the war, with the additional skills that he had acquired, Smith released his pent-up energy and ideas in a burst of creation between 1945 and 1946. His output soared and he went about perfecting his own, very personal symbolism.

Traditionally, metal sculpture meant bronze casts, which artisans produced using a mold made by the artist. Smith, however, made his sculptures from scratch, welding together pieces of steel and other metals with his torch, in much the same way that a painter applied paint to a canvas; his sculptures are almost always unique works.

Smith, who often said, "I belong with the painters", made sculptures of subjects that had never before been shown in three dimensions. He made sculptural landscapes (e.g. Hudson River Landscape), still life sculptures (e.g. Head as Still Life) and even a sculpture of a page of writing (The Letter). Perhaps his most revolutionary concept was that the only difference between painting and sculpture was the addition of a third dimension; he declared that the sculptor's "conception is as free as a that of the painter. His wealth of response is as great as his draftsmanship."

Smith was awarded the prestigious Guggenheim Fellowship in 1950, which was renewed the following year. Freed from financial constraints, he made more and larger pieces, and for the first time was able to afford to make whole sculptures in stainless steel. He also began his practice of making sculptures in series, the first of which were the Agricolas of 1951–59. He steadily gained recognition, lecturing at universities and participating in symposia. He separated from Dehner in 1950, with divorce in 1952. During his time as a visiting artist at Indiana University, Bloomington, in 1955 and 1956, Smith produced the Forgings, a series of eleven industrially forged steel sculptures. To create the Forgings, he cut, plugged, flattened, pinched and bent each steel bar, later polishing, rusting, painting, lacquering or waxing its surface.

Beginning in the mid-1950s, Smith explored the technique of burnishing his stainless steel sculptures with a sander, a technique that would find its fullest expression in his Cubi series (1961–65). The scale of his works continued to increase - Tanktotem III of 1953 is 7' tall; Zig I from 1961 is 8'; and 5 Ciarcs from 1963 is almost 13' tall. Finally, in the late 1950s Smith began using spray paint - then still a new medium - to create stenciled shapes out of negative space, in works closely tied to his late-career turn toward geometric planes and solids.

His family was also getting bigger; he remarried and had two daughters, Rebecca (born 1954) and Candida (born 1955). He named quite a few of his later works in honor of his children (e.g., Bec-Dida Day, 1963, Rebecca Circle, 1961, Hi Candida, 1965).

The February 1960 issue of Arts magazine was devoted to Smith's work; later that year he had his first West Coast exhibition, a solo show at the Everett Ellin Gallery in Los Angeles. The following year he rejected a third-place award at the Carnegie International, saying “the awards system in our day is archaic.”

In 1962, Gian Carlo Menotti invited Smith to make sculptures for the Festival dei Due Mondi in Spoleto. Given open access to an abandoned steel mill and provided with a group of assistants, he produced an amazing 27 pieces in 30 days. Not yet finished with the themes he developed, he had tons of steel shipped from Italy to Bolton Landing, and over the next 18 months he made another 25 sculptures known as the Voltri-Bolton series.

Paintings and drawings

Smith continued to paint and draw throughout his life. By 1953, he was producing between 300 and 400 drawings a year. His subjects encompassed the figure and landscape, as well as gestural, almost calligraphic marks made with egg yolk, Chinese ink and brushes and, in the late 1950s, the "sprays". He usually signed his drawings with the ancient Greek letters delta and sigma, meant to stand for his initials. In the winter of 1963–64, he began a series known as the "Last Nudes". The paintings in this series are essentially drawings of nudes on canvas. He drew with enamel paint squeezed from syringes or bottles onto a canvas spread onto the floor. Untitled (Green Linear Nude) is painted in a metallic olive green enamel, and exemplifies the artist's late action paintings.

Major works

Smith often worked in series.  He is perhaps best known for the Cubis, which were among the last pieces he completed before his death. The sculptures in this series are made of stainless steel with a hand-brushed finish reminiscent of the gestural strokes of Abstract Expressionist painting. The Cubi works consist of arrangements of geometric shapes, which highlight his interest in balance and the contrast between positive and negative space.

Prior to the Cubis, Smith gained widespread attention for his sculptures often described as "drawings in space".  He was originally trained as a painter and draftsman, and sculptures such as Hudson River Landscape (1950) and The Letter (both 1950) blurred the distinctions between sculpture and painting. These works make use of delicate tracery rather than solid form, with a two-dimensional appearance that contradicts the traditional idea of sculpture in the round.

As with many artists from the Modernist period, including Jackson Pollock and Mark Rothko, much of Smith's early work was heavily influenced by Surrealism. Some of the best examples are seen in the Medals for Dishonor, a series of bronze reliefs that speak out against the atrocities of war. Images from these medals are strange, nightmarish, and often violent. His own descriptions give a vivid picture of the medals and strongly express condemnation of these acts, such as this statement about Propaganda for War (1939–40):

The rape of the mind by machines of death – the Hand of God points to atrocities. Atop the curly bull the red cross nurse blows the clarinet. The horse is dead in this bullfight arena – the bull is docile, can be ridden.

Gallery of works

Exhibitions
Smith's first solo show of drawings and welded-steel sculpture was held at the Willard Gallery in New York in 1938. In 1941, Smith sculptures were included in two traveling exhibitions organized by the Museum of Modern Art and were shown at the Whitney Museum of American Art's Annual exhibition in New York.

Smith represented the United States in the 1951 São Paulo Art Biennial and at the Venice Biennale in 1954 and 1958. Six of his sculptures were included in an exhibition organized by the Museum of Modern Art, New York, that traveled to Paris, Zurich, Düsseldorf, Stockholm, Helsinki, and Oslo in 1953–54; he was given a retrospective exhibition by MoMA in 1957. In 1961, the MoMA organized an exhibition of fifty Smith sculptures that traveled throughout the United States until the spring of 1963. At the Los Angeles County Museum of Art, "David Smith: Cubes and Anarchy" took a thematic look at the sculpture Smith produced between the Depression years and his death.

Recent solo exhibitions (selection)
February 12–May 15, 2011: David Smith Invents, The Phillips Collection, Washington
April 3–July 24, 2011: Los Angeles County Museum of Art. Los Angeles.
October 6, 2011 – January 8, 2012: Whitney Museum of American Art. New York.

Collections
Works by David Smith are included in major collections worldwide, including the Whitney Museum of American Art and the Museum of Modern Art, New York. The Storm King Art Center has 13 Smith sculptures in its collection. The Governor Nelson A. Rockefeller Empire State Plaza Art Collection includes 5 Smith sculptures in is collection.

Recognition
He received a Creative Arts Award from Brandeis University in 1964, and in February 1965 was appointed by Lyndon B. Johnson to the National Council on the Arts.

Death
He died in a car crash near Bennington, Vermont on May 23, 1965. He was 59 years old.

Writings
 Gray, Cleve, ed. David Smith by David Smith: Sculpture and Writings. New York, London: Thames & Hudson, 1968, rpt. 1989.

See also
Cubi series
Agricola I by Smith at the Hirshhorn in Washington, D.C.
Environmental sculpture

Notes

Further reading
Gimenez, Carmen, ed. David Smith; A Centennial. New York: Guggenheim Museum, 2006.
Krauss, Rosalind. Terminal Iron Works: The Sculpture of David Smith. Cambridge: MIT Press, 1971.
David Smith: Medals for Dishonor. New York: Independent Curators Incorporated, 1996.
Smith, Candida N. The Fields of David Smith. New York, London: Thames & Hudson, 1999.
Wilkin, Karen. David Smith. New York: Abbeville Press, 1984.

External links

 David Smith estate
 David Smith at Gagosian Gallery
 Cubi XXVII
 Volton VVX at Eskenazi Museum of Art at Indiana University
 David Smith on Widewalls

Abstract sculptors
Abstract expressionist artists
American abstract artists
Modern sculptors
1906 births
1965 deaths
American contemporary painters
American male sculptors
Painters from Indiana
Sculptors from Indiana
Art Students League of New York alumni
People from Decatur, Indiana
People from South Bend, Indiana
People from Paulding, Ohio
Road incident deaths in Vermont

20th-century American sculptors
20th-century American male artists
Sculptors from New York (state)